Ricardo Greenidge (born 12 February 1971) is a Canadian retired sprinter and bobsledder. He represented his country in the four-man bobsled at the 1998 Winter Olympics finishing ninth. His biggest success of his athletics career was a silver medal in the 200 metres at the 1994 Jeux de la Francophonie.

Competition record

Personal bests

Outdoor
100 metres – 10.37 (+1.4 m/s, Victoria 1994)
200 metres – 20.61 (+0.8 m/s, Odessa 1994)
Indoor
60 metres – 6.91 (Saskatoon 1999)
200 metres – 21.60 (Toronto 1993)

References

External links

1972 births
Living people
Athletes from Ottawa
Canadian male sprinters
Commonwealth Games competitors for Canada
Athletes (track and field) at the 1994 Commonwealth Games
Olympic bobsledders of Canada
Bobsledders at the 1998 Winter Olympics